The alveolar septum separates adjacent alveoli in lung tissue.  The minimal components of an alveolar septum consist of the basement membranes of alveolar-lining epithelium (mostly type I pneumocytes) and capillary endothelium.  Thicker alveolar septa may also contain elastic fibers, type I collagen, interstitial cells, smooth muscle cells, mast cells, lymphocytes and also monocytes.

References
 Robbins and Cotran, Pathologic Basis of Disease, 7th Ed. pp 712–713.

Lung anatomy